Pyridine-2-carbaldehyde, also called 2-formylpyridine, is an organic compound with the formula NC5H4CHO.  It is one of three isomeric pyridinaldehydes.  The other isomers are pyridine-3-carboxaldehyde and pyridine-4-carboxaldehyde. 

Pyridine-2-carbaldehyde is a colorless oily liquid with a distinctive odor. Older samples are often brown-colored owing to impurities.   It serves as a precursor to other compounds of interest in coordination chemistry and pharmaceuticals.  Pyridine aldehydes are typically prepared by oxidation of the hydroxymethyl- or methylpyridines.

Reactions and uses
The drug pralidoxime can be produced from 2-formylpyridine.

The aldehyde functional group is subject to nucleophilic attack, specifically by amines to form Schiff bases, which serve as bidentate ligands.  Iminopyridine complexes can be remarkably robust.

References 

Aromatic aldehydes
2-Pyridyl compounds